Allan Eriksson (21 March 1894 – 20 February 1963) was a Swedish discus thrower. He competed at the 1920 Summer Olympics and finished in sixth place. Eriksson won the national title in the two-handed discus throw in 1923–25 and held the national record in this event. In 1928, he was awarded Stora Grabbars Märke number 52.

References

1894 births
1963 deaths
Swedish male discus throwers
Olympic athletes of Sweden
Athletes (track and field) at the 1920 Summer Olympics